The 2006 Betta Electrical 500 was an endurance motor race for V8 Supercars. The race was held on 3 September 2006 at Sandown International Raceway in Victoria, Australia, and was the eighth round of the 2006 V8 Supercar Championship Series. It was the 39th in a sequence of "Sandown long distances races" which are commonly referred to under the Sandown 500 name.

The race was won by Jason Bright and Mark Winterbottom driving a Ford BA Falcon for Ford Performance Racing.

Top ten shootout
Results as follows:

Official results
Results as follows:

References

Statistics
 Provisional pole position - #22 Ryan Briscoe - 1:10.8590
 Pole position - #2 Garth Tander - 1:10.6102
 Fastest lap - #2 Garth Tander - 1:11.7104
 Average race speed - 148 km/h

External links
 Official race results 
 Official V8 Supercar website

Motorsport at Sandown
Betta Electrical 500
Pre-Bathurst 500